Chhanka (Quechua for cliff, hispanicized spelling Chanca) is a mountain in the Andes of Peru, about  high . It is located in the Lima Region, Cajatambo Province, Cajatambo District. Chhanka lies southwest of Pishtaq. A little lake named Tuqtuqucha ("hen lake") lies at its feet.

References

Mountains of Peru
Mountains of Lima Region